Basketball is a part of the Islamic Solidarity Games since the 2005 edition.

At the 2005 and 2013 event, the tournament was held as a competition of "regular" 5 on 5 full court basketball. Since 2017, it has been played as a 3x3 basketball half court tournament.

Men's tournament

Summary

Medals per nation

Participating nations

Women's tournament

Summary

Note

External links
 Basketball at the Islamic Solidarity Games

 
Basketball competitions in Asia between national teams
Basketball at multi-sport events